The Trolley Square shooting was a mass shooting that occurred on the evening of February 12, 2007, at Trolley Square Mall in Salt Lake City, Utah. A gunman identified as Sulejman Talović killed five bystanders and wounded four others before being shot dead by several members of the Salt Lake City Police Department. Authorities were not able to determine a motive.

Events

Shooting
On February 12, 2007, at 6:42 p.m. MST, Talović arrived at the Trolley Square Mall, parking his vehicle in the upper level of the mall's west parking garage. He was wearing a white shirt, a tan trench coat, and was carrying a pistol grip 6-shot 12-gauge pump-action shotgun, a 38-caliber handgun, and a backpack full of extra ammunition. Two minutes after exiting his vehicle, Talović encountered 52-year-old Jeffrey Walker and his 16-year-old son Alan in the parking garage. He shot and wounded both in the head with his shotgun; Alan Walker managed to run down a staircase to the lower parking level, where he was assisted by other citizens. However, Talović stood over Jeffrey Walker, who had fallen to the ground after being shot, and shot him repeatedly in the head and back, killing him.

Continuing onward to the west entrance of the mall, Talović shot 34-year-old Shaun Munns twice with the shotgun from approximately 30 yards away. Munns managed to flee the scene and survive his injuries. Talović then fired twice at the entrance doors, causing shoppers inside the store to hide or flee. Entering the mall, he approached the west stairs, where he fired at a security guard, missing, then walked down the main level hallway in the opposite direction. There, he shot 29-year-old Vanessa Quinn in the chest with his revolver; when she fell to the ground, Talović stood over her and killed her with a second gunshot to the head.

Talović then entered Cabin Fever, a card store where seven people were hiding. He first approached 44-year-old Carolyn Tuft, who was crouched down near a display table at the front of the store, and shot her in the left side and arm with the shotgun, causing her to fall over to the ground. He then spotted 53-year-old Stacy Hanson crouching near the southeast glass wall of the store. Hanson said to him "Everyone just wants to go home," to which Talović told him to "Shut up!" before shooting and injuring him in the lower abdomen and arm with the shotgun, also shattering the glass wall; Hanson fell face-down into the glass.

Talović then approached a group of three people: 15-year-old Kirsten Hinckley (whose mother was the injured Carolyn Tuft), 24-year-old Brad Frantz, and 29-year-old Teresa Ellis. All three victims were lying on the floor in the southern front of the store. Talović fired from his shotgun, hitting all three people. Frantz died of a gunshot wound to the forehead, while Hinckley suffered a wound to the torso and Ellis suffered wounds to the right arm, torso, and leg. He then left the store briefly to reload, during which Carolyn Tuft crawled towards her injured daughter. Talović returned, shooting Tuft, Hinckley, and Ellis again; Hinckley and Ellis both died of gunshot wounds to the head, while Tuft survived a wound to the back.

Police response
Leaving Cabin Fever a second time, Talović encountered off-duty police officer Kenneth Hammond of the Ogden City Police Department. At the time, Hammond was at Trolley Square on an early Valentine's Day dinner with his pregnant wife, 911 dispatcher Sarita Hammond, when they heard gunshots. Sarita Hammond borrowed a waiter's cell phone to call 911. Drawing his weapon, Hammond identified himself as a police officer, and Talović fired twice at him with his shotgun, missing. Moving around the central hallway area, Talović focused his gunfire at three restaurant employees, firing from near the south entrance of the Pottery Barn Kids home-furnishing store. Witnessing him returning to Cabin Fever and shooting Stacy Hanson in the back, an employee, Barrett Dodds, yelled at Talović, prompting him to walk back towards Pottery Barn. Hanson survived his injuries.

Meanwhile, Sergeant Andrew Oblad of the Salt Lake City Police Department entered Trolley Square through the south entrance and encountered Kenneth Hammond. Talović fired at both officers, and Hammond fired back in return. An active shooter contact team composed of Salt Lake City PD SWAT team members Sergeant Joshua Scharman, Detective Dustin Marshall, Detective Brett Olsen, and Officer Gordon Worsencroft eventually arrived and confronted Talović from behind. Scharman and Olsen shot him a total of eight times in the back with their Heckler & Koch MP5 service weapons, and Marshall also shot him five times with his AR-15 service rifle. When Talović turned around and aimed his shotgun towards the team, Scharman and Olsen fired again and killed him. Talović's body was later found to have been struck a total of 15 times by bullets fired by police. At least 30 rounds were fired by Talović, 29 of which came from his shotgun and at least one from his revolver. The entire shooting lasted for six minutes.

According to local TV station KTVX, several witnesses reported that most of the shooting took place on the ground floor near the Pottery Barn store, though the majority of the dead and injured were found in Cabin Fever. One of the victims, having been shot, apparently entered the nearby Hard Rock Cafe and told customers to lock the doors. The wounded victims were transported to local hospitals, some in critical condition.

Victims

Killed
 Jeffrey Walker, 53 (shot at the west parking garage)
 Vanessa Quinn, 29 (shot at the main level hallway)
 Brad Frantz, 24 (shot inside Cabin Fever)
 Kirsten Hinckley, 15 (shot inside Cabin Fever)
 Teresa Ellis, 29 (shot inside Cabin Fever)

Injured
 Alan "A.J." Walker, 16 (son of Jeffrey Walker, shot at the west parking garage)
 Shawn Munns, 34 (shot near the west entrance)
 Carolyn Tuft, 43 (mother of Kirsten Hinckley, shot inside Cabin Fever)
 Stacy Hanson, 53 (shot inside Cabin Fever)

Perpetrator

Sulejman Talović (October 6, 1988 – February 12, 2007) was identified as the perpetrator of the shooting. He was born in Cerska, a town in the Vlasenica municipality of Bosnia and Herzegovina, and later immigrated with his family to the United States in 1998. Talović was a permanent resident who received a green card in 2005 and lived with his mother, father and three sisters in Salt Lake City at the time of the shooting. As a child, Talovic frequently spent time at the mall, and it was described as "the only place he went." The family at one point lived one block away. He had a record of minor juvenile incidents and had dropped out of high school at age 16.

After the shooting, Talović was buried in his birthplace, the small village of Talovići near Cerska, Bosnia and Herzegovina, on March 2, 2007. Sulejman's father Suljo Talović soon moved back to Bosnia and told media outlets that he was too sad and ashamed to stay living in a country where his son committed mass murder.

Motive
Talović's aunt Ajka Omerović emerged briefly from the family's house to say relatives had no idea why he attacked so many strangers. She said that Talović had lived in Sarajevo as a child, and that his family moved to Utah from Bosnia. "He was such a good boy. I don't know what happened," she told Salt Lake City television station KSL-TV.

In another KSL interview, with Omerović, and Talović's father, Suljo Talović, the two indicated concern that some outside influence might have induced Sulejman to commit the killings. "I think this [Sulejman] did. I think somebody (is) behind him, I think, but I am not sure...."

The father suggested that the U.S. government bears some responsibility for his son's actions, saying "The authorities are guilty for not alerting us that he bought a gun. In the U.S., you cannot buy cigarettes if you are under-aged, but you can buy a gun." Federal law prohibits the sale of handguns and handgun ammunition to those under 21 from federally licensed gun dealers although some states allow 18+ to purchase handguns through legal private sales. Long guns (being a rifle or shotgun) and rifle/shotgun ammunition are prohibited to those under 18. Talović had bought the guns in a pawn shop.

In the light of the War on Terrorism some commentators, including John Gibson and U.S. Representative Chris Cannon suggested that Talović repeatedly shouted "Allahu Akbar" prior to his death, suggesting a religious motive, citing video of the rampage which supposedly captures Talović's religious shouting. After being told that police investigators had not uncovered any evidence to support his claims, Cannon's spokesman said the congressman accepts that Talović did not yell anything of a religious nature. FBI agent Patrick Kiernan  stated that he had no reason to suspect terrorism. Ajka Omerović was quoted as saying, "We are Muslims, but we are not terrorists."

Officers honored
Five officers were honored at the Utah State Capitol on February 16 for their bravery in the Trolley Square shooting.

They are Sergeant Andrew Oblad, Sergeant Joshua Scharman, Detective Dustin Marshall, and Detective Brett Olsen, all of the Salt Lake City Police Department; and Officer Kenneth Hammond of the Ogden Police Department.

On February 13, 2007, Salt Lake City police officials thanked Hammond as a hero for saving countless lives.

See also
 Ward Parkway Shopping Center shooting
 Hudson Valley Mall shooting
 Tacoma Mall shooting
 Westroads Mall shooting
 Sello mall shooting

References

External links

Official statement by owners concerning shooting spree
Message from the governor of Utah concerning shooting
Audio of Trolley Square 911 calls and police band radio audio from KNRS Radio
CBS News coverage of shooting and message-board
KSTU-Fox coverage of shooting spree
KTVX-ABC coverage of shooting spree
KSL-NBC message-boards and coverage of shooting spree
KUTV-CBS coverage of shooting spree
Video by bystander in shooting of police inside Trolley Square
Was banning weapons at Trolley wise?
Picture of Trolley Square rules, including prohibition on weapons

Deaths by firearm in Utah
Murder in Utah
2007 in Utah
Mass murder in 2007
2007 murders in the United States
2007 mass shootings in the United States
Mass shootings in the United States
Attacks on shopping malls
Crimes in Utah
2000s in Salt Lake City
Attacks in the United States in 2007
February 2007 events in the United States
Mass shootings in Utah
Attacks on buildings and structures in the United States